O psie, który jeździł koleją (from Polish: About the dog that traveled by train) is 1967 Polish-language children's book by Roman Pisarski. The book was based on the life of Lampo, a dog that became famous for his rail journeys across Italy in the 1950s and 1960s. It is a school reading in the third-grade classes of primary schools in Poland. It was published in 1967 in Warsaw, Poland by Biuro Wydawnicze Ruch.

References 

1967 children's books
Polish children's novels
Books about dogs
Children's books about rail transport
Biographical novels